Stalingrad is the 13th studio album by German heavy metal band Accept, which was released on 6 April 2012, by the independent German record label Nuclear Blast Records. It is their second album since their 2009 reunion, and like its predecessor, Blood of the Nations (2010), was produced by Andy Sneap.

Reception

Critical reception of the album has been largely favorable. AllMusic published a review giving the album three-and-a-half stars out of five. Reviewer James Christopher Monger also noted that current vocalist Tornillo does an "awfully convincing Udo Dirkschneider impression." Brave Words & Bloody Knuckles and Thrash Hits also gave the album positive reviews.

The album was successful, debuting at number six on the German albums chart. Stalingrad also debuted at number 81 on the Billboard 200, becoming Accept's first album to crack the top 100 in the United States since Metal Heart (1985), which peaked at number 94.

The album was honored with a Metal Storm Award in 2012, when it was voted Best Heavy Metal/Melodic Album.

Track listing
Music by Wolf Hoffmann and Peter Baltes. Lyrics by Mark Tornillo.

Note
 The limited boxed set slipcase edition by Nuclear Blast contains a DVD from the Bang Your Head!!! (tracks 1-3) and Masters of Rock festivals (tracks 4 & 5) respectively plus two music videos

Personnel
Band
 Mark Tornillo – lead vocals
 Wolf Hoffmann – guitar
 Herman Frank – guitar
 Peter Baltes – bass guitar
 Stefan Schwarzmann – drums

Production
 Produced, engineered, mixed and mastered by Andy Sneap

Chart performance

References

Accept (band) albums
2012 albums
Albums produced by Andy Sneap
Nuclear Blast albums